Plagiostropha flexus is a species of sea snail, a marine gastropod mollusk in the family Drilliidae.

Description

Distribution
This marine species is endemic to Australia and occurs in the demersal zone off Croker Island, Gulf of Carpentaria, Northern Territory, at a depth of 125 m.

References

  Tucker, J.K. 2004 Catalog of recent and fossil turrids (Mollusca: Gastropoda). Zootaxa 682:1–1295
 Wells, F.E. 1991. A revision of the Recent Australian species of the turrid genera Clavus, Plagiostropha, and Tylotiella (Mollusca: Gastropoda). Journal of the Malacological Society of Australasia 12: 1–33

External links

flexus
Gastropods of Australia
Gastropods described in 1983